Alpha Alpha was a 1972 German science fiction fantasy television series which aired on ZDF. It starred Karl Michael Vogler, Lilith Ungerer, Arthur Brauss and Horst Sachtleben. Each episode was only 25 minutes long; the series lasted only one season. Karl Michael Vogler played agent alpha of an unnamed secret organization, investigating mysteries, technical and psychic phenomena and even alien encounters. Alpha Alpha'''s tenor was comparable to the later X-Files'' drama television series.

Episodes 

All episodes are written and directed by Wolfgang F. Henschel
1. Die Organisation - first aired 17. Mai 1972
2. Gedanken sind frei - first aired 10. Mai 1972
3. Wie die Ratten - first aired 24. Mai 1972
4. Der Astronaut - first aired 31. Mai 1972
5. Omega schweigt - first aired 7. Juni 1972
6. Der Weltfriede - first aired 14. Juni 1972
7. Abbilder - first aired 21. Juni 1972
8. Die List des Odysseus - first aired 28. Juni 1972
9. Die Nacht im Zoo - first aired 5. Juli 1972
10. Ein begabtes Kind - first aired 12. Juli 1972
11. Heute ist Damals - first aired 19. Juli 1972
12. Außer Dienst - first aired 26. Juni 1972
13. Unsterblichkeit  - first aired 2. August 1972

See also
List of German television series

External links
 

1972 German television series debuts
1972 German television series endings
ZDF original programming
German science fiction television series
German fantasy television series
German-language television shows